Richard Aaron Bell  (born May 3, 1967) is a former American football running back who  played a single season in the National Football League (NFL) with the Pittsburgh Steelers.

Early life
Bell was born in Los Angeles, California  and is a 1984 graduate of John Muir High School in Pasadena, California.

He matriculated at the University of Nebraska.

Football  career
Bell was drafted by the Pittsburgh Steelers in the twelfth round of the 1990 NFL Draft.  After appearing in eight games with the Steelers in 1990, he was left unprotected by the team under Plan B free agency and was signed by the Kansas City Chiefs.  He was released by the Chiefs prior to the 1991 season.

Post-football career

West Covina Police Chief 2017.

Personal
His son, Jered Bell, played defensive back for the University of Colorado at Boulder.

References

1967 births
Living people
Players of American football from Los Angeles
American football running backs
Nebraska Cornhuskers football players
Pittsburgh Steelers players
John Muir High School alumni